Mount Limbo is a  summit located in Pershing County, Nevada, United States.

Description
Mount Limbo is the fourth-highest peak of the Selenite Range which is a subset of the Great Basin Ranges. This peak is set in the Mount Limbo Wilderness Study Area which is owned by the Bureau of Land Management. This landform's toponym was officially adopted in 1965 by the U.S. Board on Geographic Names.

Climate
Mount Limbo is set in the Great Basin Desert which has hot summers and cold winters. The desert is an example of a cold desert climate as the desert's elevation makes temperatures cooler than lower elevation deserts. Due to the high elevation and aridity, temperatures drop sharply after sunset. Summer nights are comfortably cool. Winter highs are generally above freezing, and winter nights are bitterly cold, with temperatures often dropping well below freezing.

See also
 
 Great Basin

References

External links
 Weather forecast: Mount Limbo

Mountains of Pershing County, Nevada
Mountains of Nevada
North American 2000 m summits
Mountains of the Great Basin